is a Japanese singer and actress, a former member of Morning Musume, and currently a member of Dream Morning Musume.

Biography

Career
She was born in Muroran, Hokkaidō, Japan.

On August 13, 2003, she released her first single, "22 Sai no Watashi," which means "Me, 22 years old," just a few days after her 22nd birthday. Her first full-length album, Hitoribotchi, was then released on February 4, 2004, containing many solo versions of Morning Musume songs.  In August 2005, her fifth single, "Koi no Hana," which means "Flower of Love," was released, and she also became a member of the Hello! Project special unit Def.Diva together with Maki Goto, Rika Ishikawa and Aya Matsuura in October. The single "Takaramono" was also released in November credited as "Sen", who is the main character of the drama "Takaramono", played by Abe. In the spring of 2006, Abe released a new single, "Sweet Holic", together with a new album, "2nd ~Shimiwataru Omoi~". June 2006 saw Abe release "The Stress," a cover of the 1989 song by pop idol Chisato Moritaka.  
In October of the same year "Amasugita Kajitsu" was released, reaching 5th on the Oricon Chart, the highest place she achieved since "Koi no Telephone Goal" in 2004.

On October 5, 2008, Abe performed in an event to mark the 30th anniversary of the Sunshine City building in Ikebukuro. She was joined by other artists who were popular in the 1980s, such as Hiroko Moriguchi and Ayumi Nakamura.  It was announced on October 19, 2008, on the official Hello! Project website, that Abe will graduate from Hello! Project along with the rest of Elder Club on March 31, 2009.

On September 15, 2010, Abe released her 12th single, .  In 2010, it was announced that Natsumi Abe was going to form a new group named "Dream Morning Musume" with several other former Morning Musume members.

In summer 2011, Natsumi Abe was cast in the live action drama Arakawa Under the Bridge as P-ko.

Traffic accident 
On October 7, 2007, Abe's car collided with a motorcyclist in Shibuya, Tokyo. The motorcyclist suffered minor injuries, but Abe was unhurt. She had obtained her driver's license only in July of that year.

Other 
She is married and a mom of three little boys.

Discography

Singles

Albums

Acts

Television

Dramas
 
 
 Angel Hearts (2002)
 
 Takaramono (November 2005)
 Arakawa Under the bridge (2012)

Radio

Movies
 Morning Cop
 Pinch Runner
 Tokkaekko
 Last Present
 Koinu Dan no Monogatari
 Prison Girl
 Tokyo Decibels

Dubbing
 PAW Patrol: The Movie, Liberty

Publications

Photobooks

Essay books

Calendars
 
 Natsumi Abe 2005 Calendar (September 2004)
 Natsumi Abe 2006 Calendar (October 12, 2005)
 Natsumi Abe 2007 Calendar (October 2006)

References

External links 
 Official Hello! Project discography 
 Abe Natsumi file at JaME
 Official Home Page 
 Official Blog 

1981 births
Living people
Def.Diva members
Hello! Project solo singers
Japanese women pop singers
Japanese child singers
Japanese female idols
Japanese film actresses
Japanese television actresses
Dream Morning Musume members
Morning Musume members
People from Muroran, Hokkaido
Salt5 members
Musicians from Hokkaido
20th-century Japanese women singers
20th-century Japanese singers
21st-century Japanese actresses
21st-century Japanese women singers
21st-century Japanese singers